Agnidra discispilaria is a moth in the family Drepanidae. It was described by Frederic Moore in 1867. It is found in north-eastern India, Sikkim and Thailand.

The wingspan is 19–23 mm for males and 21.5-22.5 mm for females. The wings are dull pale sienna reddish, crossed by numerous ill-defined irregular greyish-brown lines. The external border and angle of the forewings is clouded with the same colour. All wings have a dark rounded slate-grey spot at the inferior angle of the discoidal cell. There are some greenish-white scales in each of these spots.

References

Moths described in 1867
Drepaninae
Moths of Asia